A highly elliptical orbit (HEO) is an elliptic orbit with high eccentricity, usually referring to one around Earth.
Examples of inclined HEO orbits include Molniya orbits, named after the Molniya Soviet communication satellites which used them, and Tundra orbits.

Such extremely elongated orbits have the advantage of long dwell times at a point in the sky during the approach to, and descent from, apogee. Bodies moving through the long apogee dwell appear to move slowly, and remain at high altitude over high-latitude ground sites for long periods of time. This makes these elliptical orbits useful for communications satellites. Geostationary orbits cannot serve high latitudes because their elevation above the horizon from these ground sites is too low.

Sirius Satellite Radio used inclined HEO orbits, specifically the Tundra orbits, to keep two satellites positioned above North America while another satellite quickly sweeps through the southern part of its 24-hour orbit. The longitude above which the satellites dwell at apogee in the small loop remains relatively constant as Earth rotates. The three separate orbits are spaced equally around the Earth, but share a common ground track.

References

Earth orbits
Satellite broadcasting